David Charles Puckett (born 29 October 1960) is a former professional footballer who played in The Football League for Aldershot, Bournemouth, Southampton, and Stoke City.

Playing career
Puckett began his career with Southampton during the 1970s and played nearly 100 games for them in the First Division between 1978 and 1986, scoring 14 times. However, he struggled to hold down a first team place and was transferred to Third Division side Bournemouth in 1986, helping them win that division's title and promotion to the Second Division a year later. During his time at Bournemouth he played on loan for Stoke City and Swansea City.

Puckett suffered a major knee injury while playing for the Dean Court side and was loaned to Aldershot in the 1988–89 season, scoring a hat-trick on his Third Division debut for the club, and was soon signed on a permanent basis, but was unable to save the Shots from relegation.

He made a total of 113 appearances for Aldershot in the league, scoring 50 goals, before returning to Bournemouth during the 1991–92 season, a few weeks before Aldershot went out of business and left the Football League.

The return to Bournemouth was Puckett's final contribution to senior football, as he made just four appearances for the club before hanging up his boots in professional football during 1992.

In 2011 Puckett signed for Wessex League club Lymington Town and on 26 November 2011 scored to become the league's oldest ever goalscorer at the age of 51. He later broke this record while playing for Totton & Eling when scoring at the age of 53 in February 2013.

On 21 of May 2014 Puckett played a 4th division game in Iceland for Hvíti Riddarinn (The White Knights). Puckett was substituted in to the game in the 66th minute along with his son Bill who is one of two coaches of the team. The Knights won the game 2–0.

Coaching career
In July 2003, Puckett returned to Southampton as coach to the Saints academy, working with seven to 12-year-olds. He is currently the Assistant Academy Manager, working with 12- to 16-year-olds.

Career statistics
Source:

A.  The "Other" column constitutes appearances and goals in the Football League Trophy, Full Members Cup and Screen Sport Super Cup.

Honours
Southampton
Football League Division 1 Runners-up: 1983–84

Woking
FA Trophy: 1993–94

Lymington Town
Oldest goalscorer in the Wessex League Premier Division.

References

External links
 

1960 births
Footballers from Southampton
English footballers
Stoke City F.C. players
Southampton F.C. players
Swansea City A.F.C. players
Aldershot F.C. players
AFC Bournemouth players
Woking F.C. players
Lymington Town F.C. players
English Football League players
Living people
Totton & Eling F.C. players
Association football forwards
Southampton F.C. non-playing staff
Association football coaches